Mabel Burnege (born about 1880 – died July 2, 1972) was an English actress in musical comedies and operettas.

Early life 
Burnege graduated from the Royal College of Music in London.

Career 
Mabel Burnege toured with the D'Oyly Carte Opera Company, performing in Gilbert and Sullivan productions, from 1903 to 1907, including a tour in South Africa. She appeared on the London stage, including roles in Bob (1903), The Mountaineers (1909), Fallen Fairies (1909), The Islander (1910), The Chocolate Soldier (1910-1911), Nightbirds (1912), The Laughing Husband (1913), and Within the Law (1913-1914).

Burnege had one Broadway credit, in The Merry Countess (1912), with an English company. She also toured North America with this show, for about a year. She was considered "an English beauty" and "very clever" by one 1913 reviewer. She was also described as the "special chum" of the star of that show, Jose Collins.

Personal life 
Mabel Burnege died in 1972, aged about 90 years.

References

External links 
 A cigarette card featuring Mabel Burnege, from the George Arents Collection, New York Public Library.
 

1880s births
1972 deaths
English actresses